Denmark competed at the 1980 Winter Paralympics in held in Geilo, Norway. Eight competitors (six men and two women) from Denmark did not win any medals and so finished last in the medal table.

All athletes competed in cross-country skiing.

Cross-country 

The following athletes represented Denmark:

 Jens Bromann
 Arne Christensen
 Bent Christensen
 Jorn Clausen
 Else Hansen
 Michael Hansen
 Peder Hansen
 Helene Helledi

No medals were won.

See also 

 Denmark at the Paralympics
 Denmark at the 1980 Summer Paralympics

References 

Denmark at the Paralympics
1980 in Danish sport
Nations at the 1980 Winter Paralympics